Saurav Sharma is an Indian taekwondo fighter who has represented India at the Asian Championships, 2018 at Ho Chi Minh City, Vietnam . He is supported by the GoSports Foundation through the Rahul Dravid Athlete Mentorship Programme. In 2017, he was awarded the Bhima Award by the state government of Haryana .

Early and personal life 

Saurav Sharama was born on 24 June 1993 in Sonipat district of Haryana. His father is a farmer and his mother is a housewife. Saurav started playing taekwondo in 2007 at the age of 14. After that he represented India in many international tournaments.

Achievements 
Commonwealth championship 2017, Montreal, Canada - silver
South Asian games 2019 - silver medal 
India open ranking tournament 2019 Hyderabad - bronze
Asian games -2014 incheon Korea - 5th position

References 

Living people
1993 births
Indian male taekwondo practitioners